was a Japanese chemist and was a Professor of Chemistry first at Osaka City University until his retirement in 1983 at  Kyoto University in Japan. In 1972, Kumada's group reported nickel-catalyzed cross coupling reactions nearly concurrently with the Corriu group working in France. The Kumada coupling now bears his name.

References

1920 births
2007 deaths
Japanese chemists
People from Fukui Prefecture
Kyoto University alumni
Academic staff of Kyoto University